This is a list of films produced by the Tollywood (Telugu language film industry) based in Hyderabad in the year 1970.

References 

1970
Telugu
Telugu films